The Gates of Creation (1966) is a science fiction novel by American author Philip José Farmer.  It is the second in his World of Tiers series.

Plot summary
A demigod disguised as an Earthman and Lord of the Planet of Many Levels, Wolff-Jadawin must enter the many-leveled universe constructed for his torment and destruction in order to save his bride from the satanic Master Lord Urizen.

External links
  
 The Gates of Creation, worldcat.org

See also
Simulated reality in fiction

1966 American novels
American science fiction novels
Novels by Philip José Farmer
Ace Books books